Awutu is a Guang language spoken by 180,000 in coastal Ghana.

Awutu is the principal dialect. The other two are Efutu and Senya.

References

Guang languages
Languages of Ghana